Friesland – Wilhelmshaven – Wittmund is an electoral constituency (German: Wahlkreis) represented in the Bundestag. It elects one member via first-past-the-post voting. Under the current constituency numbering system, it is designated as constituency 26. It is located in northwestern Lower Saxony, comprising the city of Wilhelmshaven and the districts of Friesland and Wittmund.

Friesland – Wilhelmshaven – Wittmund was created for the inaugural 1949 federal election. Since 2017, it has been represented by Siemtje Möller of the Social Democratic Party (SPD).

Geography
Friesland – Wilhelmshaven – Wittmund is located in northwestern Lower Saxony. As of the 2021 federal election, it comprises the independent city of Wilhelmshaven and the entirety of the districts of Friesland and Wittmund.

History
Unterems was created in 1949. In the 1949 election, it was Lower Saxony constituency 3. For the 1953 through 1961 elections, it was constituency 25 in the numbering system. From 1965 through 1998, it was constituency 21; from 2002 through 2009, it was constituency 27. Since the 2013 election, it has been constituency 26.

Originally, it comprised the city of Wilhelmshaven and the district of Friesland. At this time, it was named Wilhelmshaven – Friesland. In the 1965 election, the constituency gained the districts of Aurich and Wittmund, while losing the municipalities of Bockhorn, Neuenburg, Sande, Varel, Varel-Land, and Zetel, which were transferred to the Oldenburg constituency. Due to administrative reforms, in the 1976 election, it lost the municipality of Gödens.

In the 1980 election, the constituency was renamed to Friesland – Wilhelmshaven, and gained the municipality of Sande. The municipalities of Bockhorn, Varel, and Zetel also returned to the constituency in the 2002 election. In the 2013 election, it acquired its current name of Friesland – Wilhelmshaven – Wittmund.

Members
The constituency has been held by the Social Democratic Party (SPD) during all but three Bundestag terms since 1949; it has returned a representative from the SPD in every federal election since 1969. Its first representative was Johann Cramer of the SPD, who served a single term from 1949 to 1953. In 1953, the constituency was won by Hellmuth Heye of the Christian Democratic Union (CDU), who served until 1961. Cramer won the constituency back for the SPD in 1961, but Felix von Eckardt of the CDU won it in 1965. Cramer again won the constituency in 1969, and served a third term. He was succeeded by Herbert Ehrenberg in 1972, who served until 1990. Gabriele Iwersen served from 1990 to 2002, followed by Karin Evers-Meyer from 2002 to 2017. Siemtje Möller won the constituency in 2017.

Election results

2021 election

2017 election

2013 election

2009 election

References

Federal electoral districts in Lower Saxony
1949 establishments in West Germany
Constituencies established in 1949